Islamic contributions may refer to:

Islamic Golden Age
Islamic contributions to Medieval Europe
Zakaat, Islamic alms-giving